Marin Soljačić (born February 7, 1974) is a Croatian-American physicist and electrical engineer known for wireless non-radiative energy transfer.

Biography
Marin Soljačić was born in Zagreb in 1974. After graduating from XV Gymnasium (MIOC) in Zagreb he attended MIT, where he got his BSc in physics and electrical engineering in 1996. In 1998 he got his MSc from Princeton University and in 2000 he got his PhD in Physics. In 2005 he became a professor of Physics at MIT. In 2008, he was awarded a MacArthur Fellowship.

Work
In 2007 Marin Soljačić and his assistants successfully made the first efficient non-radiative power transfer at a distance of 2 meters turning on a 60 W light bulb. Energy transfer was 40% efficient. Professor Soljačić's experiments and work in wireless energy transfer are related in spirit to the work of Nikola Tesla in the early 20th century, but also have significant differences: unlike Tesla's long-range wireless energy transfer in Colorado, the Soljačić group focuses only on short-range transfer, and unlike Tesla coils which resonantly transfer power with electric fields (which couple strongly to surrounding matter, most famously inducing artificial lightning) the Soljačić proposal uses coupling primarily via magnetic fields.  This work is currently being pursued in Soljačić's WiTricity company. Soljačić believes that low-power commercial application of this technology, such as charging of mobile phones, is several years away.

In addition to wireless energy transfer, Prof. Soljačić works on numerous problems on electromagnetism  in materials structured on the scale of the wavelength, such as micro- and nano-structured materials for infrared and visible light, including nonlinear optical devices and surface plasmons. His more recent research, supported by a US$20 million grant from the U.S. Department of Energy, focuses on use of photonic crystals in solar cells.

References

External links
BBC article explaining non-radiative power transfer
TED presentation on technology application
 

1974 births
Living people
Croatian physicists
21st-century American physicists
Croatian emigrants to the United States
MacArthur Fellows
MIT School of Engineering alumni
Massachusetts Institute of Technology School of Science faculty
Scientists from Zagreb
21st-century Croatian scientists
MIT Department of Physics alumni